Wetwork is a euphemism for murder or assassination that alludes to spilling blood. The expression and the similar wet job, wet affair, or wet operation are all calques of Russian terms for such activities and can be traced to criminal slang from at least the 19th century and originally meant robbery that involved murder, or spilling blood.

The operations are reputed to have been handled by the CIA and by the KGB's SpecBureau 13 (Spets Byuro 13), known as the "Department of Wet Affairs".

See also 
 Black operation
 Liquidate

References

External links

Illegal occupations
Murder
Euphemisms